The 2016–17 Coupe de la Ligue was the 23rd French league cup competition. The competition was organized by the Ligue de Football Professionnel and was open to the 44 professional clubs in France that are managed by the organization.

Paris Saint-Germain were the three-time reigning champions, having defeated Lille 2–1 in the previous season's final, and they successfully defended their title, defeating Monaco 4–1 in the 2017 final.

First round
First round matches were held over 1 day; 9 August 2016. The 12 winners secured places in the second round. All times in Central European Time.

Note: The numbers in parentheses are the tier for the team during the 2016–17 season.

Second round
The round featured the 12 winners of the first-round matches. The matches were held over 1 day; 23 August 2016. The 6 winners secured places in the third round. All games in Central European Time.

Note: The numbers in parentheses are the tier for the team during the 2016–17 season.

Third round
The Third Round, also known as the Round of 32, featured the 6 winners of the second round matches in addition to 14 Ligue 1 clubs who were not participating in the European competitions. The matches were played 25 and 26 October 2016. All games in Central European Time.

Note: The numbers in parentheses are the tier for the team during the 2016–17 season.

Round of 16
The Fourth Round, also known as the Round of 16, featured the 10 winners of the third round matches in addition to 6 Ligue 1 clubs who are participating in the European competitions. The matches were played on 13 and 14 December 2016. All times are CET (UTC+1).

Note: The numbers in parentheses are the tier for the team during the 2016–17 season.

Quarter-finals
The fifth round, also known as the quarter-finals, features the 8 winners of the fourth round matches. The matches were played on 10 and 11 January 2017. All times are CET (UTC+1).

Note: The numbers in parentheses are the tier for the team during the 2016–17 season.

Semi-finals
The Sixth Round, also known as the semi-finals, featured the 4 winners of the quarter-finals matches. The matches were played on 24 and 25 January 2017. All times are CET (UTC+1).

Note: The numbers in parentheses are the tier for the team during the 2016–17 season.

Final

The final was played on 1 April 2017. For the first time since 1998, the final was not played at the Stade de France.
PSG won the final beating Monaco 4–1 to claim their 7th League Cup.

Top goalscorers

References

External links

 Official site  

2016-17
France 2
League Cup